The three-story, neoclassical Wolfe Music Building at 2112 Euclid Avenue in Cleveland, Ohio was designed by the well-known, Cleveland-based architecture firm Walker and Weeks in 1927.

History
The Wolfe Music building was built in 1927 to house the Wolfe Music store, founded in 1917 by Harry Wolfe.  The commercial building itself was owned and developed by Anthony Carlin. The building was designed by Walker and Weeks, arguably one of the most important architecture firms in Cleveland's history, and contracted to the Crowell and Little Construction Company. The structure was designed with the Wolfe Music store in mind, with adequate retail, showroom, and rehearsal space. The facade is white terracotta and Georgian white marble, with a bronze and glass storefront.

The Wolfe Music building was built in a time when Euclid Avenue was transitioning from the residential Millionaire's Row to a street that was quickly becoming an up-and-coming showcase for arts, culture, and commerce. Euclid avenue featured department stores, art galleries, design studios, architecture firms, and varied upscale retail such as fur coat and jewelry stores. The buildings on this stretch of Euclid Avenue were designed to be landmark buildings that stood the test of time, well represented by the Trinity Cathedral and New Amsterdam Hotel which shared this stretch of Euclid Avenue with the Wolfe Music building.

The Wolfe Music building gets its name from the eponymous Wolfe Music store, which moved into the ground floor retail space at the building's inception. The store was shuttered a short time later in 1930 and the building remained vacant until 1943 when it became home to the National Register Company operating in the building from 1943-1958. From 1958-1966 the Wolfe again sat vacant until the space was taken over by the Cooper School of Art, which would remain from 1968-1978. Most recently the building was leased to a Kinko's, until the structure was purchased in 1996 by Cleveland State University, with original plans for the building to be demolished to develop a bookstore on the lot. The building had not been in use since 1996. In late 2011, the building was nominated for listing in the National Register of Historic Places, and was reviewed for local landmark status by the City of Cleveland's Landmark Commission.

As of August 2015, Google Earth views show that the building has been demolished and a new structure is being raised on the site.

References

Buildings and structures completed in 1927
Buildings and structures in Cleveland
Cleveland State University
Neoclassical architecture in Ohio
Neoclassical architecture in Cleveland